Euphaedra camiadei is a butterfly in the family Nymphalidae. It is found in the Central African Republic.

References

Butterflies described in 2004
camiadei
Endemic fauna of the Central African Republic
Butterflies of Africa